Óscar González (April 22, 1990 – February 3, 2014) was a Mexican professional boxer. During his career, he fought at super bantamweight and featherweight.

González fought as a professional from 2007 until 2014, with a career record of 23 wins against 1 defeat. His nickname was "Fantasma", which is the Spanish word for "ghost". His promoter was Box Latino, the same company that promoted Erik Morales.

Boxing career 

González was born in Tepic, Nayarit, the son of Miguel Angel González and Luz Teresa Arriaga. He turned professional in Mexico in March 2007, and later won the WBC Youth World Super Bantamweight and the WBC (USNBC) Super Bantamweight titles. His better known victories included wins over Rico Ramos, Raúl Hirales, Giovanni Caro, Adrian Young, Héctor Velázquez, Caril Herrera, Manuel Aguilar, Wacharakrit Senahan and Carlos Fulgencio.

Death 
On February 1, 2014, González took on Jesús Galicia in a bout for the WBC Latino Silver. González was hospitalized after a 10th-round knockout, and a few days later, died at the age of 23.

Personal life
González was married to Magaly Avalos.

References

External links 

1990 births
2014 deaths
Sportspeople from Tepic, Nayarit
Boxers from Nayarit
Deaths due to injuries sustained in boxing
Sport deaths in Mexico
Super-bantamweight boxers
Featherweight boxers
Mexican male boxers